Eslamabad-e Sofla (also Romanized as Eslāmābād-e Soflá) is a village in Qeshlaq-e Shomali Rural District, in the Central District of Parsabad County, Ardabil Province, Iran. At the 2006 census, its population was 180, in 47 families.

References 

Towns and villages in Parsabad County